The Saebyŏl-class ( Saebyŏl, "New Star") is a medium-duty diesel-hydraulic shunting locomotive built by the Kim Chong-t'ae Electric Locomotive Works for the Korean State Railway.

The Saebyŏl-class locomotives have a centrecab body design, with a full-width cab offset from the centre towards the rear of the locomotive and external walkways along the engine compartment hoods, and are slightly larger than the Red Flag-class shunters. They are powered by a  diesel engine with a hydrokinetic transmission, and have a Bo-Bo wheel arrangement.

Numbered in the 3000 series, they are painted overall dark green with a yellow stripe. Possibly over 200 have been built; they are used primarily for shunting works in mainline stations in North Korea, and can frequently seen on the P'yŏngŭi Line and other mainlines. The class name, if written in Hanja, is 新星. In this case, these hanja are read as saebyŏl (새별, "New Star"; however, the Soviet-built K62 (M62)-class locomotives have the class name Sinsŏng (신성, "Nova"), which are written with the same hanja. In practice this is not an issue, as the use of Chinese characters to write Korean is officially discouraged in the DPRK.

Electric shunters
An unknown number of Saebyŏl-class diesel shunters have been converted to 3,000 V DC electric operation by the removal of the diesel engine and the addition of pantographs and other necessary equipment; this work was carried out at the Kim Chong-t'ae Works. The rebuilt units retain their original number and paint.

References

Standard gauge locomotives of North Korea
Kim Chong-tae Works locomotives
Bo-Bo locomotives